Francesco Intinacelli (born 12 November 2001) is an Italian footballer. He plays for Serie D club Casale.

Club career
He made his Serie B debut for Ascoli on 17 June 2020 in a game against Cremonese.

On 5 October 2020 he joined Serie C club Fermana on loan. He only made one substitute appearance for Fermana in the first half of the season, and on 8 January 2021 his loan was terminated and he returned to Ascoli, where he was assigned to the Under-19 squad.

On 27 August 2021 he extended his contract for Ascoli until 2023; on the same day he went to Montevarchi on loan.

On 9 September 2022, Intinacelli moved to Casale in Serie D.

Club statistics

Club

References

External links

2001 births
Living people
Sportspeople from Chieti
Italian footballers
Association football forwards
Serie B players
Serie C players
Ascoli Calcio 1898 F.C. players
Fermana F.C. players
Montevarchi Calcio Aquila 1902 players
Casale F.B.C. players
Footballers from Abruzzo
21st-century Italian people